Four Music (Four Music Productions GmbH) is a German record label founded by hip hop group Die Fantastischen Vier in 1996. It was originally located in Stuttgart, but has moved to Kreuzberg, Berlin.

In 2004, Max Herre's debut album, as well as Confidence by Gentleman, and Viel by Die Fantastischen Vier were among the top 3 in the German album charts. The same year, the opening concert for the Popkomm solely consisted of artists signed on Four Music.

In July 2005, the record label Sony BMG Music Entertainment took over 50% of Four Music Productions for a seven-figure sum of money. According to the Annual Report of Four Music GmbH of fiscal year 2009 to 2010, Sony Music Entertainment Germany GmbH has acquired all the shares of Four Music GmbH.

Notable artists
Notable musicians and groups signed on Four Music are:
 3Plusss
 Afrob
 Blumentopf (until 2009)
 Casper
 Chakuza
 Clueso
 Freundeskreis (until 2007)
 Gentleman (until 2010)
 Jason Rowe
 Joy Denalane
 Lance Butters
 Mark Forster
 Marteria
 Max Herre
 Miss Platnum
 Son Goku (until 2002)

See also
List of record labels

External links 
 
 Four Music Artists
 Die Fantastischen Vier

German independent record labels
Record labels established in 1996
Reggae record labels
Hip hop record labels